National Medical College is affiliated with Tribhuvan University, Kathmandu, Nepal. The college has been accorded permanent recognition by the Nepal Medical Council for its adherence to international standards set for the undergraduate and postgraduate level medical education by the World Federation for Medical Education. The World Health Organization (WHO) has listed this college in its World Directory of Medical Schools.
This college also offers post-graduation in different specialities. 

The medical and allied health science courses offered are based on the curriculum of Tribhuvan University.

Eligibility for admission to postgraduate programme

• Age:
There is no age limit for admission in postgraduate medical courses in any subject.

• Entrance Examination:
a. Regarding Nepalese nationals, selection of applicants is done from among those who have passed and under counselling and on basis of merit list the Postgraduate Medical Entrance Examination conducted by Tribhuban University.
b. National Medical College was established in 2001, promoted by the “National Medical College Company Pvt. Ltd.” under the chairmanship of Dr. Jainuddin Ansari, a surgeon who has earned national and international credentials for the promotion of medico-social.

Programs 
The programs offered by the medical college are:
 M.B.B.S. – 6 years
 Post Graduate Medical Education (M.D./M.S.) – 3 years
 Master in Public Health
The programs offered by the nursing campus are:
 Proficiency Certificate Level in Nursing – 3 years
 Bachelor of Science in Nursing – 4 years
 B.N. (Post Basic) Nursing – 2 years

Facilities of the teaching hospital:
 The Surgery Department has superspecialization facility.
The building is designed to suit international standards teaching hospital at present houses internal medicine, cardiology, nephrology, general surgery, urology, pediatric surgery, orthopedic and trauma obstetrics and gynaecology, pediatric, eye, gastroenterology, skin, venereal disease, psychiatry, anesthesiology, radiology, dental, and emergency departments.

References

External links 
 

Universities and colleges in Nepal